Messala Merbah (born 22 July 1994) is an Algerian footballer who plays for USM Alger.

Club career
In 2020, Messala Merbah signed a two-year contract with ES Sétif.

In 2021, Messala Merbah signed a two-year contract with USM Alger.

References

External links

1994 births
Living people
Association football midfielders
Algerian footballers
JS Saoura players
People from Tizi Ouzou Province
Kabyle people
21st-century Algerian people